The 2021 Tour de Luxembourg was the 81st edition of the Tour de Luxembourg road cycling stage race. It was held from 14 and 18 September, as part of the 2021 UCI Europe Tour and the 2021 UCI ProSeries.

Teams 
Eight UCI WorldTeams, twelve UCI ProTeams, and one UCI Continental team made up the twenty-one teams that participated in the race. Each team entered a squad of six riders.

UCI WorldTeams

 
 
 
 
 
 
 
 

UCI ProTeams

 
 
 
 
 
 
 
 
 
 
 
 

UCI Continental Teams

Route

Stages

Stage 1 
14 September 2021 — Luxembourg City (d'Coque) to Luxembourg City (Kirchberg),

Stage 2 
15 September 2021 — Steinfort to Esch-sur-Sûre (Eschdorf),

Stage 3 
16 September 2021 — Mondorf-les-Bains to Mamer,

Stage 4 
17 September 2021 — Dudelange to Dudelange,  (ITT)

Stage 5 
18 September 2021 — Mersch to Luxembourg City (Limpertsberg),

Classification leadership table 

 On stage 2, Bauke Mollema, who was second in the points classification, wore the cyan jersey, because first-placed João Almeida wore the yellow jersey as the leader of the general classification. For the same reason, Marc Hirschi will wear the cyan jersey on stage 5.
 On stage 2, Marc Hirschi, who was second in the young rider classification, wore the white jersey, because first-placed João Almeida wore the yellow jersey as the leader of the general classification.
 On stages 3 and 4, David Gaudu, who was third in the young rider classification, wore the white jersey, because first-placed Marc Hirschi wore the yellow jersey as the leader of the general classification and second-placed João Almeida wore the cyan jersey as the leader of the points classification. Gaudu continued to wear the white jersey on stage 5, but with Hirschi and Almeida having exchanged leader's jerseys.

Final classification standings

General classification

Points classification

Mountains classification

Young rider classification

Team classification

References

External links 

Tour de Luxembourg
Tour de Luxembourg
Tour de Luxembourg
Tour de Luxembourg
Tour de Luxembourg